Taggett Branch is a stream in Washington County in the U.S. state of Missouri. It is a tributary of Calico Creek.

Taggett Branch has the name of the local Taggett family.

See also
List of rivers of Missouri

References

Rivers of Washington County, Missouri
Rivers of Missouri